The 1948 UCI Track Cycling World Championships were the World Championship for track cycling. They took place in Amsterdam, Netherlands from 23 to 29 August 1948. Five events for men were contested, 3 for professionals and 2 for amateurs.

Medal summary

Medal table

See also
 1948 UCI Road World Championships

References

Track cycling
UCI Track Cycling World Championships by year
International cycle races hosted by the Netherlands
UCI World Championships
UCI Track Cycling World Championships
UCI Track Cycling World Championships , 1948
Cycling in Amsterdam